Arctic poppy is a common name which may refer to the following Papaver species:

 Papaver radicatum